Skatutakee Lake is a  water body located in Cheshire County in southwestern New Hampshire, United States, in the town of Harrisville. Water from Skatutakee Lake flows via Nubanusit Brook to the Contoocook River in Peterborough and ultimately to the Merrimack River.

The lake is classified as a warmwater fishery, with observed species including smallmouth and largemouth bass, chain pickerel, horned pout, northern pike, and black crappie.

See also

List of lakes in New Hampshire

References

Lakes of Cheshire County, New Hampshire